In molecular biology, the IMPDH/GMPR family of enzymes includes IMP dehydrogenase and GMP reductase. These enzymes are involved in purine metabolism. These enzymes adopt a TIM barrel structure.

References

Protein domains